Giancarlo Bassi (23 February 1926 – 17 May 2019) was an Italian ice hockey player. He competed in the men's tournament at the 1948 Winter Olympics.

References

1926 births
2019 deaths
Ice hockey players at the 1948 Winter Olympics
Olympic ice hockey players of Italy
Sportspeople from the Province of Parma